Group F at the 1998 FIFA World Cup comprised Germany and Yugoslavia of UEFA, Iran of the Asian Football Confederation and the United States from the CONCACAF region.

Germany and Yugoslavia both started well by beating the United States and Iran respectively. The United States were then eliminated with a match to spare after losing to Iran, while Germany drew with Yugoslavia. Iran needed to win their final game against Germany to qualify but were defeated, which meant that Yugoslavia would still have qualified even without their victory over United States. Germany's two goals against both the United States and Iran put them top on goal difference.

Standings

Germany advanced to play Mexico (runner-up of Group E) in the round of 16.
Yugoslavia advanced to play Netherlands (winner of Group E) in the round of 16.

Matches

FR Yugoslavia vs Iran

Germany vs United States

Germany vs FR Yugoslavia

United States vs Iran

Germany vs Iran

United States vs FR Yugoslavia

Group F
Group
Group
Group
Group